The Barefoot Theatre Company is a theatre company in New York City.

The Barefoot Theatre Company was founded in 1999 by a multicultural group of artists. The company develops theater and film (via sister co. Barefoot Studio Pictures) in New York and Los Angeles.

Post production  

Past productions have included the first stage adaptation of Sidney Lumet's Dog Day Afternoon in 2008, and a revival of Lanford Wilson's Balm in Gilead in 2005.

Francisco Solorzano is artistic director; Victoria Malvagno is a managing director; Christopher Whalen is producing director.

References

External links
 Company blog

Performing groups established in 1999
1999 establishments in New York City
Theatre Ensemble in New York City